is a Japanese family tracing its origins to Bizen Province, and heirs of Fujiwara no Hidesato.

Notable members of the clan include: Matsuda Mototaka.

The Matsuda clan was a clan of the Hatano family, Fujiwara no Hidesato house, originated in Matsuda-go in Ashigarakami County, Sagami Province. They had a family line in the western area of Bizen Province in the late Muromachi period; another in Kyoto as a shogun's retainer in the Muromachi period; the head family of the Sagami Matsuda family serving for the Kaga Maeda family after serving for the Odawara Gohojo family; and the Yuki family and a family line serving as a hatamoto (direct retainers of the Edo bakufu) of the Tokugawa Shogun family as its branch families.

It is thought that they were the Soryo (government) family which orchestrated the Hatano family which resided in Sagami Province in the Kamakura period. From the period of the Northern and Southern Courts to the Muromachi period, the Soryo system collapsed, and influential non-heir families and clans got independent from the head family, so it is uncertain which family was the head family of the Matsuda clan.

History 
Its origin is said to be either a family of the Hatano clan, a descendant of Fujiwara no Hidesato or a Gokenin (an immediate vassal of the shogunate in the Kamakura and Muromachi through Edo periods) in Sagami Province, and in fact, they had several family trees and there is no accepted theory about it. This section is mentioned according to the theory of the Gokenin in Sagami Province.

According to the theory of the Gokenin, Matsuda Motokuni, a son of Matsuda Motokuni, took sides with Emperor Godaigo, and he was given Ifuku-go in Mino County, Bizen Province as a reward for the subjugation of the Kamakura Shogunate, and he built Toyama-jo Castle there to make it his base. Meanwhile, the record that Matsuda Moriaki(松田盛明) was Shugo (military governor) in Bizen Province in this period is confirmed, but the relationship with Motoyasu or Motokuni is unclear. In a later period, in 1467 in the time of Matsuda Motozumi(松田元澄) when the Onin War occurred, he took sides with the Akamatsu clan in the Eastern army, and made a great achievement to clear off the Yamana clan in the Western army, which made him the Akamatsu clan's vassal, in a position equivalent to Shugodai (deputy military governor) in Ifuku-go. Because of the Matsuda clan's having built the unchallenged power in the western Bizen Province in around 1483, the Akamatsu clan, the Shugo, was wary of them, and Uragami Norikuni, a family member of Uragami Norimune, who was ordered to hunt down and kill them by Akamatsu Masanori, attacked them. Matsuda Motonari asked the Yamana clan for reinforcements as well as making a sortie from Kanagawa-jo Castle, the new base from 1480, and took control of the Fukuoka-jo Castle (Bizen Province), where Ogamo Yamato-no-kami (the governor of Yamato Province) in the Akamatsu clan's side resided, in the New Year in 1484. Motonari, building on the momentum, he advanced to the east to take control of Mitsuishi-jo Castle, where Uragami Norikuni resided, in March, 1484, with an aim to hold Bizen Province in his hand. But he encountered the Uragami's forces at Tennobara to the east of the Yoshii-gawa River on the way, where he suffered a major defeat at the battle, and he killed himself at Yagami Murayama in Iwanashi County when he was caught up by the Uragami's forces on his way of backdown.

Still after that, the Matsuda clan reigned over the Western Bizen and was against the Uragami clan. In a later period, in the time of Matsuda Motomichi, he assumed his post as Shoshidai (deputy governor of the Board of Retainers) in the capital in Kyoto in 1522 under the reign of Ashikaga Yoshiharu, but he died at the Battle of Tennoji in 1531 along with his colleague Uragami Muramune. In the time of his grandson Matsuda Mototeru, when Ukita Naoie increased his influences, he had his son Matsuda Motokata marry a daughter of Naoie to ally, and further, he took sides with Amago Haruhisa, who had strong influence in Mimasaka and Bicchu at the time, advancing to Bizen to attack the Uragami clan, by which he tried to maintain his power. In 1568, however, Ugaki Yoemon, his important senior vassal, was killed by Ukita Naoie, and Iga Hisataka, the lord of Kogura-jo Castle, went over to the other side by Naoie's plot, and in August in the same year, Kanagawa-jo Castle was attacked by the Ukita's forces, and Mototeru was killed by the firearms troop of Iga Hisataka. Motokata's brother Motonaga fled to Bicchu (one theory is that he served for Toyokuni Yamana in Inaba), and the Matsuda clan was destroyed.

Nichiren sect 
The Matsuda clan earned its place as a devote believer of the Nichiren sect as well as the Kazusa Sakai clan in the history of Buddhism. After Matsuda Motokata challenged Daikaku (a disciple of Nichizo), who was doing missionary work in Bizen during Kenmu and Rekio era (1334-1341), on a religious debate and lost, and he protected this. After that, the successive family heads provided protection for the temples of this sect, and also forced temples of the other sects to convert where they advanced. Therefore, even after the destruction of the Matsuda clan, a powerful follower group called 'Bizen Hokke' was formed, which later made Bizen known as the base of Fujufuse (Not Receive and Not Give) School.

Muromachi Shogunate's retainer 
The Matsuda clan, which was among Hyojoshu (members of the Council of State) of the Muromachi Shogunate along with the Nikaido clan and the Hatano clan, existed in the Muromachi period. In the Oei era (1394-1427), there appeared a person in history as Mandokoro shitsujidai (deputy steward of the administration office), and Matsuda Mitsuhide, Matsuda Hideoki and Matsuda Kazuhide were appointed as Kunin bugyo, the head of bugyonin (magistrates). After the Onin-Bunmei Wars, Matsuda Kazuhide, Matsuda Nagahide, Matsuda Kiyohide and Matsuda Haruhide were appointed as Mandokoro shitsujidai, the head of Mandokoro Yoriudo (officers of the administration office), and they were active as bugyonin of the shogunate along with the Inoo clan and the Sei clan until the Eiroku era (1558-1570).

The Odawara Hojo clan's vassal 
The forefather of the Sagami Matsuda clan was Fujiwara no Kamatari, and the 13th head Fujiwara no Kinmitsu became the governor of Sagami Province and settled in Hadano, Sagami Province. The 14th head Fujiwara no Tsunenori changed the family name to Hatano, and became the founder of the Hatano clan.

The 19th head Yoshitsune lived in Matsuda-go. His son Aritsune took the name of Matsuda and called himself Jiro Matsuda, and became the founder of the Matsuda clan. The families separated from the Hatano clan at the time were Kawamura, Hirosawa, Otomo, Shobu, Numata, Otsuki, Koiso and Uji other than Matsuda.

The Hatano and Matsuda families originally sided with the Minamoto clan, and Hatano Yoshimichi moved to Kyoto and served for Minamoto no Yoshitomo. After the Hogen War in 1156, however, he ended up being forced to kill Minamoto no Tameyoshi, Yoshitomo's father and the former lord, which made him fall out with Yoshitomo and go back to Sagami Province. This was the way they took sides with the Taira family when the Minamoto clan fell.

Yoshitsune defeated the Yoritomo's army at the Battle of Ishibashiyama in 1180 along with Oba Kagechika, and he held Matsuda-jo Castle to offer resistance with his family when Yoritomo entered Kamakura, but he was forced out by Yoritomo and killed himself. Matsuda Aritsune, Yoshitsune's heir, was in the residence of Oba Kageyoshi in Futokorojima at that time, and got out of trouble. The mother of Minamoto no Tomonaga, Minamoto no Yoritomo's older half brother, was also Yoshitsune's aunt, and Oba Kageyoshi was a senior vassal of Yoshitomo, Yoritomo's father, and a patriarch of the Kamakura Shogunate as well. Since Aritsune MATSUDA was also a nephew of Kageyoshi OBA, Kageyoshi secretly provided him with protection, being aware of the attacking against Yoshitsune in advance. Later, Oba Kageyoshi brought Matsuda Aritsune to see Yoritomo, and Aritsune was forgiven and given Matsuda-go, and he called himself Jiro Matsuda, which was the foundation of the Matsuda clan.

At the Battle of Wada in 1213, there were numbers of the Matsuda family members, who took sides with Wada Yoshimori.

After Nitta Yoshisada entered Musashi Province to defeat the Kamakura Shogunate, and was crushed by the Kamakura Hojo Army at the 'Bubaigawara War', the Matsuda family joined the army of Nitta Yoshisada along with the partisan army of Sagami Province.

In the period of the Northern and Southern Courts, they took sides with Emperor Godaigo of the Southern Court, and jointed the army of Nitta Yoshisada. After Nitta Yoshisada died, a total of 6,000 troopers of the army of Nitta Yoshioki and Wakiya Yoshiharu moved to castles in Tanzawa Nishi including Matsuda-jo Castle and Kawamura-jo Castle, and Ashikaga Takauji himself attacked them with a large force, which made Ashigara a major battlefield. At that time, the Matsuda family spread across various areas, and the Bizen Matsuda clan belonged to the Muromachi Shogunate in the Northern Court.

In the late Muromachi period, the Ashikaga clan as Kanto-kubo (Governor-general in Kanto region) declined, and the eighth head Matsuda Yorihide, who lived in Kyoto, went to Kanto by order of the shogun. At that time in Sagami Province, the Omori clan occupied Odawara-jo Castle and conquered other clans, and tried to overpower the Matsuda clan as well. The Matsuda clan faced a hard battle against the offense of the Uesugi Ogigayatsu clan and the Omori clan, and in 1495, when Hojo Soun brought down Omori Fujiyori and entered Odawara-jo Castle, Matsuda Yorihide cooperated. The Bizen Matsuda clan, the Matsuda clan serving as Muromachi Shogunate's retainer, and the Sagami Matsuda clan had a close connection, and Matsuda Kazuhide, Matsuda Nagahide, Matsuda Yorisuke, Matsuda Hideyuki (秀致), Matsuda Morihide and Matsuda Haruhide from the Bizen Matsuda clan, the Matsuda clan serving as Muromachi Shogunate's retainer rushed over for the back up at that time.

The Sagami Matsuda clan ranked the seven families of Goyuishoke (successive retainers of the Hojo family) as vassals of the Hojo family, and served as Karo (chief retainer). They had the highest value of shoryo (territory) among the vassals of the Hojo clan: 2798 kan (unit of currency) 110 mon (unit of currency) (3922 kan 995 mon as the Matsuda family).

The Matsuda clan was at their zenith at the time of the tenth head Matsuda Norihide, and they were unmatched in power as successive Hitto karo (the head of chief retainers) of the Hojo family.

On the occasion of the Siege of Odawara by Toyotomi Hideyoshi in 1590, Norihide insisted on a plot to hold the castle at the hyojo (meeting) in the Odawara-jo Castle, saying 'The Toyotomi side has 220 thousand soldiers and The Hojo side is outnumbered with 50 thousand, so having an open battle without any chance of winning is reckless.'
On the other hand, Hojo Ujiteru and Hojo Ujikuni insisted on an open battle, but Norihide's plot to hold the castle was adopted.
Meanwhile, Norihide used tactics on the postwar management with Toshiie MAEDA and Hidemasa HORI on his own accord to surrender the castle 'under the condition of securing Sagami Province and two provinces in Izu, and life of all the members for the Hojo family.'
However, Toyotomi Hideyoshi trumpeted a strategic rumor of Norihide's betrayal aiming at disruption inside Odawara-jo Castle. Soon after this, Odawara-jo Castle surrendered.

After the fall of the Hojo clan, the Matsuda clan was employed for 4,000 koku (crop yield) by the Maeda clan that they were negotiating with. Although their kokudaka (yield quantity) changed later, the Matsuda clan existed as the retainer of the Kaga Domain until 1871, when Haihan-chiken (abolition of feudal domains and establishment of prefectures) was executed.

The descendants of Matsuda Yasusada, Norihide's younger brother, served for Tokugawa Ieyasu, and survived as Hatamoto (direct retainers of the shogunate).

References

Fujiwara clan
Japanese clans